The Phenice method is a form of gross morphological analysis used to determine the sex of an unidentified human skeleton based on three characteristics of the pelvis: the ventral arc, sub-pubic concavity, and the medial aspect of the ischiopubic ramus. It is named after T.W. Phenice, who first described the method in a 1969 paper. The Phenice method should only be used for adult individuals because inter-sex differences in the morphology of the pelvis are secondary sexual characteristics present only in post-pubertal individuals.

Determining sex using the Phenice method

Ventral arc
The ventral arc is a ridge of bone on the inferior aspect of the anterior surface of the pubis present only in females.

Sub-pubic concavity
From the anterior view, female os coxae display concavity of the ischiopubic ramus along the medial edge. In males, the medial edge of the ischiopubic ramus from the anterior view is straight.

Medial aspect of the ischiopubic ramus
From the medial view, the medial aspect of the ischiopubic ramus has a sharp edge inferior to the pubic symphyseal face in females. In males, this surface is broad and flat.

References

Comparative anatomy
Morphology (biology)